Lakshman Rao Mohite (15 June 1932 – 17 January 2016), better known by his pen-name Geethapriya, was an Indian film director and lyricist of the Kannada film industry. He has directed 40 films and penned over 250 songs in Kannada films. In 1992–93, he was awarded the Puttanna Kanagal Award for his contribution to Kannada cinema as a director.

Early life 
Geethapriya was born as Lakshman Rao Mohite in 1931, to Ramarao Mohite and Lakshmibai. His father worked for the cavalry regiment of Mysore State Troops called Mysore Lancers, which was stationed in Bangalore. Even though his mother tongue was Marathi, he was always interested in the Kannada language and was admitted to a Kannada-medium school. The poet P. T. Narasimhachar lived in the same quarters as Geethapriya's family and was a huge influence in the latter's career. He was also inspired by the writings of K. Shivaram Karanth, Masti Venkatesh Iyengar, T. R. Subba Rao and A. N. Krishna Rao. He tried his hand in writing from his middle school days and sent his poems and short stories to magazines like Thaayinaadu, Ramarajya.

Following his completion of CA intermediate, Geethapriya took up small writing assignments. He then worked as a clerk in Cubbon Park restaurant, Bangalore where he received a monthly salary of 35. Having had a brief association in theatre, he had the music director Vijaya Bhaskar and film director M. B. Singh as friends. On Bhaskar's promise of paying him 40 a month, Geethapriya entered films as a lyricist in 1954.

Geethapriya suffered from various health issues during the last few years of his life. A combination of various health complications resulted in a heart attack that caused his death on 17 Jan 2016.

Career

As lyricist 
Geethapriya started his career in films in 1954 as a lyricist, writing a song for the film, Sri Rama Pooja. He then moved to Madras (now Chennai). He worked with Y. V. Rao for the film Bhagya Chakra (1956) by writing dialogues and songs. Sri Ramanjaneya Yuddha (1963) became hit with songs like "Jagadishanaduva Jagave Natakaranga" and eleven others all whose lyrics were written by Geethapriya. This was followed by "Aadutiruva Modagale" for the film Bettada Huli (1965) and Onde Balliya Hoogalu (1967) for which Mohammed Rafi sang "Neenelli Nadeve Doora", the only song sung by him for a Kannada film.

As director 
Geethapriya directed his first film in 1968 with Mannina Maga that had Rajkumar and Kalpana playing the lead roles. It was awarded the National Film Award for Best Feature Film in Kannada and he won the Karnataka State Film Award for Best Screenplay. The film ran for a hundred days in Bangalore's Kapali and Bharat theatres.

He directed other successful films like Yaava Janmada Maithri, (1972), Beluvalada Madilalli (1975), Besuge (1976), Hombisilu (1978), Putani Agent 123 (1979) and Mouna Geethe (1985). Having directed 40 films during his career, he was awarded the Puttanna Kanagal Award for expertise in direction. He also directed three Tulu language films and one Hindi film, Anmol Sitaare.

Filmography

Direction

Lyrics

Awards
 1968 – National Film Award for Best Feature Film in Kannada – Mannina Maga
 Puttanna Kanagal Award from Karnataka Government
 2012 – Saroja Devi Award
 2012 – Sandesha Award

References

External links
 

Kannada-language lyricists
Kannada film directors
2016 deaths
1932 births
Kannada-language writers
Film directors from Bangalore
Indian lyricists
20th-century Indian film directors
20th-century Indian poets
Screenwriters from Bangalore